The Paul Daniels Magic Show is a British magic show presented by entertainer and magician Paul Daniels that aired on BBC1 from 9 June 1979 to 18 June 1994. At its peak in the 1980s, the show regularly attracted viewing figures of 15 million and was sold to 43 countries.

Series 1 consisted of 4 regular episodes and 1 Christmas Special.

Episodes

References

1979 British television seasons